Ärzte-Zeitung (company name: Ärzte Zeitung Verlags-GmbH: , ZDB (DE) 604874-2) is a German newspaper for physicians and other medical professionals. The paper was first published on 1 October 1982. It is published by Springer Medizin. The publication's head office is in Neu-Isenburg.

References

External links
  Ärzte-Zeitung

1982 establishments in West Germany
German-language newspapers
Newspapers published in Germany
Publications established in 1982
Springer Science+Business Media